The Savage Nomads were a mostly Puerto Rican and African American street gang started in the South Bronx area of The Bronx, New York during the late 1960s, gaining popularity in the 1970s. The gang was involved in a number of running battles with rival gangs Seven Immortals, Savage Skulls, and the Dirty Dozen. The Savage Nomads were alleged to be involved in numerous small crime activities in the New York City area.

In 1979 the gang was one of many featured in the documentary film 80 Blocks from Tiffany's. Like the Savage Skulls, gang members would appropriate Nazi symbolism to project "how menacing and terrible they were." This included wearing swastikas, wearing Nazi helmets and having positions called "Gestapo" within the gang's ranks.

References

See also
Universal Zulu Nation
Black Spades

Former gangs in New York City
Street gangs
African-American gangs